Sabro is a suburb of Aarhus in Denmark. Its population is 3,330 (1 January 2022).

Sabro has a sports club, football fields, a gym, grocery stores, hotels, a church, two recreation centres, a dentist, a health care center, a library and a public day school, Sabro Korsvejskolen.

Onomastics 

The name was recorded in about 1150 as Sahebroch and in 1386 as Saubro; it possibly derives from Old Danish *saghi, "somewhat cut", referring to tree-felling, and brōk, "swamp".

History 

Sabro was originally one of the smaller villages in the area, with a few houses and farms south and west of Sabro Church.

In the mid-20th century the sogn (parish) councils of Borum-Lyngby, Lading and Sabro-Fårup (of which Sabro was part until 1 April 1970) decided to make this the location of a central school, Sabro Korsvejskolen (Sabro Crossroads School), which was dedicated in 1964.

In the 1970s and 1980s the crossroads settlement and the original village merged, as part of a strong urban growth which has since continued eastwards, covering former agricultural land in the direction of the neighbouring village of Mundelstrup.

Notes

External links 

Cities and towns in Aarhus Municipality
Towns and settlements in Aarhus Municipality